Visscher Island is an island, with an area of 3.4 ha, in south-eastern Tasmania, in Australia.

It is part of the Sloping Island Group, lying close to the south-eastern coast of Tasmania around the Tasman and Forestier Peninsulas.  It is part of the Tasman National Park.

Flora and fauna
Recorded breeding seabird species are little penguin, white-faced storm-petrel, Pacific gull, kelp gull and Caspian tern. Occasionally Australian fur seals haul-out there in small numbers. The metallic skink is present.

References

Protected areas of Tasmania
Sloping Island Group